Tyne Valley-Linkletter was a provincial electoral district for the Legislative Assembly of Prince Edward Island, Canada. The district was formerly named Cascumpec-Grand River from 1996 to 2007. In 2017, the district boundaries were adjusted to include northern portions of the city of Summerside, and the district was renamed Tyne Valley-Sherbrooke.

Members
The riding has elected the following Members of the Legislative Assembly:

Election results

Tyne Valley-Linkletter, 2007–2019

2016 electoral reform plebiscite results

Cascumpec-Grand River, 1996–2007

References

 Tyne Valley-Linkletter information

Former provincial electoral districts of Prince Edward Island